Colin Stansfield is an English former professional rugby league footballer who played in the 1940s.

Playing career

International honours
Colin Stansfield won a cap for England while at Hunslet in 1945 against Wales.

Championship final appearances
Colin Stansfield  played right-, i.e. number 12, in Hunslet's 8-2 victory over Leeds in the Championship Final during the 1937–38 season at Elland Road, Leeds on Saturday 30 April 1938.

References

External links

Living people
England national rugby league team players
English rugby league players
Hunslet F.C. (1883) players
Place of birth missing (living people)
Rugby league second-rows
Year of birth missing (living people)